Helsingfors Skridskoklubb (in Swedish, HSK), in Finnish Helsingin Luistinklubi, is the oldest figure skating club in Finland. It was founded in Helsinki in 1875. When spoken in Finnish, the Swedish name is, however, more common than the Finnish, the only abbreviation used is HSK.

HSK in figure skating
HSK trains athletes and non-professionals in three figure skating disciplines: single skating, ice dance and synchronized skating. The club's most successful skaters include the ice dance pair Susanna Rahkamo/Petri Kokko, who are the 1995 European champions and 1995 World silver medalists. HSK has synchronized skating teams at all competitive levels: Team Unique at the senior, Team Mystique at the junior, Team Dynamique at the novice and Team Sympatique at the intermediate level. The club trains beginners' teams and teams in the open leagues as well.

Team Unique

The senior team Team Unique are the 2013 World and Finnish Champions.

Team Mystique

The junior team Team Mystique are the 2004 and 2005 silver medalists at the Junior World Challenge Cup.

Team Dynamique
The novice team Team Dynamique are the 2014 and 2016 Finnish Champions.

Competitive results (2002–12)

Competitive results (2012–14)

HSK in ice hockey
HSK had a successful ice hockey team during the 1930s which won the SM-sarja twice (1933 & 1934). The Ice hockey team ceased to exist in early 1950s.

References

External links
HSK's homepage (in Finnish)

Figure skating clubs
Sports clubs in Helsinki
Figure skating in Finland
1875 establishments in Finland
Sports clubs in Finland